Külüg Khan (Mongolian: Хүлэг;), born Khayishan (Mongolian: Хайсан ; , , meaning "wall"), also known by the temple name Wuzong (Emperor Wuzong of Yuan) (August 4, 1281 – January 27, 1311), Prince of Huaining (懷寧王) in 1304–1307, was an emperor of the Yuan dynasty of China. Apart from Emperor of China, he is regarded as the seventh Great Khan of the Mongol Empire, although it was only nominal due to the division of the empire. His name means "warrior Khan" or "fine horse Khan" in the Mongolian language.

Early life 

He was the first son of Darmabala and Dagi of the influential Khunggirad clan, and the full brother of Ayurbarwada. He was sent to Mongolia to assume an army that defended the western front of the Yuan against Kaidu, de facto ruler of the Chagatai Khanate, and other princes in Central Asia under him. In 1289, Khayishan's force was nearly routed and the Kipchak commander, Tutugh, rescued him from capture by Kaidu's army. In 1301 he clashed with Kaidu, who died from a battle wound. In recognition of the great success, Külüg Khan was given the title of Prince Huaining (懷寧王) in 1304.

When Chapar attacked Duwa, Temür helped the latter and sent an army under Khayishan. In 1306 Khayishan forced Melig Temür, a son of Ariq Böke, who was aligned himself with Kaidu to accept a surrender in the Altai Mountains and pushed Kaidu's successor Chapar westward. For these military achievements he gained a high reputation among Mongol princes and non-Mongol corps. Since his uncle Temür Khan did not have a male heir, he was considered a major candidate for the emperor.

Enthronement 
In 1307 when Temür Khan died, he returned eastward to Karakorum and watched the situation. Temür's widow Bulugan of the Bayaud tribe had kept away the Khunggirad-mothered brothers of Khayishan and Ayurbarwada and attempted to set up Ananda, a Muslim cousin of Temür, who was the prince of An-hsi. Her alliance was supported by some senior officials of the Secretariat under Aqutai. They made Bulugan regent and intended to put Ananda on the throne. Ananda was a popular prince who successfully protected the province of the Yuan against the Ögedeid and Chaghatayid armies and had a bulk of the imperial army under him in An-hsi. But he lacked of military power in the imperial capital city and was a Muslim opposed to the majority of the Yuan Mongols.

The Darkhan Harghasun, Tura, a great-great-grandson of Chagatai Khan, and Yakhutu, a descendant of Tolui, fought for the candidacy of Darmabala's sons against them. The pro-Darmabala faction arrested Ananda and Bulghan by coup and recalled Ayurbarwada and Dagi from Henan. Then, Khayishan decided to hold the coronation ceremony in Shangdu just as his great-grandfather Kublai Khan did, and advanced southward with thirty thousand soldiers from Mongolia. He was welcomed by Ayurbarwada, who gave up emperorship, and ascended to the throne. He had executed Ananda and Bulughan before succession. Ariq Böke's son, Melig-Temür, was also executed because of his support for Ananda.

Khayishan's enthronement at Shangdu on June 21, 1307, was performed properly at a kurultai. After that he made his younger brother Ayurbarwada the heir apparent and they promised that their descendants would succeed each other on relay.

Reign

Soon after Khayishan's accession the Classic of Filial Piety (Xiao Jing), one of the works attributed to Confucius, having been translated into the Mongolian language, was distributed in the empire. He granted the princes and officials who attended his ceremony lavish gifts in accordance with amounts set by the previous khan. Huge amounts, moreover, were spent on the construction of Buddhist temples at Dadu and Shangdu. Fresh honors were decreed to the memory of the old sage, and the characters Ta ching were added to his titles.

His administration was founded on the unstable balance between Khayishan, his younger brother Ayurbarwada and their mother Dagi of the Khunggirad clan. Khayishan appointed Ayurbarwada as Crown Prince on the condition that he would pass the status to Khayishan's son after succession. He generously gave bonus to imperial princes and Mongol aristocrats, and enjoyed popularity among them. Khayishan Külüg Khan freely gave away noble and official titles and filled the government with supernumeraries. Having little regard for the unwritten law of Kublai Khan that only sons of Khagans could be made princes of the first rank, he granted the Genghisids and the non-Borjigins many princely titles. Meanwhile, he was plagued by financial difficulties which was caused by free-spending policies and longstanding military spending. So he brought back the Department of State Affairs (Shangshu Sheng) for financial affairs in parallel with the Central Secretariat (Zhongshu Sheng) for administrative affairs. He changed branch offices of Zhongshu Sheng to those of Shangshu Sheng to strengthen monopoly in salt and other goods. He issued new bills (Jiaochao) called Zhida-yinchao to replace Zhiyuan-chao. His anti-inflation plans did not achieve adequate results in his short reign, and dissatisfied Han Chinese officers and commoners. He attempted to push through a new nonconvertible silver currency but was defeated by public resistance.

Although, he first shared with Ayurbarwada the tutorship of the Confucian scholar Li Meng, he apparently was little affected by Confucian culture. He transferred Harghasun to Mongolia as the grand councillor of the left wing of Branch secretariat of Lin-pei despite his great contribution. Khayishan heavily relied on his retainers and commanders he had brought from Mongolia. He gave key posts to them and favored non-Mongol corps including the Kipchak, the Asud (Alans) and the Qanglï. In contrast, he did not reward abundantly the Khunggirad faction who had carried out a coup against Bulughan. Because Tula said something suspicious in rage, Khayishan suspected that he had a further object, and had him tried and put to death.

Khayishan greatly favored Buddhism, so that he ordered the Tibetan Lama Chogdi Osor to translate the sacred books of Buddha. When the Buddhist monks made mistakes except in cases affecting the Yuan dynasty, he refused to punish them. A law was passed that whoever struck a Lama should lose his tongue, but Ayurbarwada repealed it as entirely contrary to precedent. However, Khayishan was the first Khagan to tax the lands held by the Buddhist monks and the followers of Taoism, hitherto exempt.

In order to reduce the cost of supporting the Yuan bureaucracy, he issued an order in 1307 to dismiss the supernumeraries and to bring total number of officials in line with the quota that had been set by his uncle Temür Khan. The order produced no practical results; the number of bureau's chief officials jumped from 6 in Kublai's reign to 32. He also had the building of court officials and a new palace city built at Dadu and Zhongdu (the ruins of Zhongdu in Zhangbei County can be seen until today).

In 1308 the Goryeo king Chungnyeol of Korea died, and Khayishan sent a patent for his successor Chungseon. That year Chapar and other princes of the Khanate of Ögedei came to Khayishan with their submission, permanently ending the threat against the Chagatai Khanate and the Yuan dynasty by Khaidu's sons. During his reign, the Yuan completed the subjugation of Sakhalin, forcing its Ainu people to accept their supremacy in 1308.

The paper became so depreciated in value that in 1309 there was a fresh issue, made to replace that which was the discredited paper, but this also sank rapidly in value, and at length the Emperor, Khaissan, determined upon a recurrence to the ancient money, and accordingly, in 1310, there were struck two kinds of copper coins, having Mongol characters upon them. Some with the inscription, precious money of the Zhida period; and others with this legend, precious money of the Great Yuan. These copper coins were of three sizes: 1 of the value of one li; 2 of the value of ten li; and 3 of coins worth several of those of the dynasties Tang and Song dynasties. Khayishan's court encountered financial difficulties. For example, the total government expenditure for the year 1307 was 10 million ting of paper notes and 3 million dan of grains. By 1310, 10,603,100 ting had been borrowed from the reserves for current expenditures.

Tula's son Kokechu conspired against the Emperor with the high court officials and Buddhist monks in 1310; but their plans were discovered, the monks were duly executed, and Kokechu was exiled to Korea. Arslan, the governor of Dadu and commander of the kheshig, shared same fate with the conspirators. He was executed with several of his companions.

During Khayishan's reign, all Branch Secretariats were renamed Branch Departments of State Affairs. The new major department of state affairs came under Toghta, the grand councillor of the left, Sanpanu and Yueh shi, managers of the government affairs, and Paopa, the assistant administrator of the right.

The selling price of salt licences issued under the state monopoly was raised by 35 percent over the price in 1307. A grain tax surcharge of 2 percent was imposed on the wealthy families of Chiang-nan. The merits of tax collectors were evaluated on the basis of the percentage increase in the taxes they collected the tax quota at the end of Temür's reign. To fight against inflation, Khayishan's administration established granaries in localities and drastically increased the quota for the maritime shipment of grain from Yangtze valley, reaching 2.9 million shih in 1310. Khayishan reduced the number of chief officials in the Secreatariat, the Censorate, the Bureau of Military Affairs, and the Bureau of Transmission as well as supernumeraries in various offices.

Death
After a reign of less than 4 years, Khayishan suddenly died on January 27, 1311. Immediately after his death and Ayurbarwada's succession in 1311, the unsatisfactory Khunggirad faction came together under his mother Dagi and purged pro-Khayishan officials. It also broke Ayurbarwada's promise to appoint Khayishan's son as Crown Prince. His court drove Khayishan's sons Kuśala and Tugh Temür out of the central government. Pro-Khayishan generals cherished grievances until they managed to set up Tugh Temür in 1328 after overthrowing another of Khayishan's relatives, Ragibagh.

Family

Parents 
Darmabala, posthumously Shunzong (1264 – 1292) 
Dagi (1266 – 1 November 1322)

Wives, concubines, and children 
Empress Xuancihuisheng (d. 1327), personal name Zhenge
 Empress Sugeshili, cousin of Zhenge
 Concubine Yiqilie, posthumously Empress Renxianzhangsheng (仁献章圣皇后)
Khutughtu, Emperor Mingzong (22 December 1300 – 29 August 1329)
 Concubine Tangwu (唐兀妃子, of the Tanguts), posthumously Empress Wenxianzhaosheng (文献昭圣皇后)
Jayaatu, Emperor Wenzong (16 February 1304 – 2 September 1332)

See also 
 List of emperors of the Yuan dynasty
 List of Mongol rulers
 List of rulers of China

Notes

References 

Great Khans of the Mongol Empire
Yuan dynasty emperors
Former Buddhists
14th-century Chinese monarchs
14th-century Mongol rulers
1281 births
1311 deaths
Mongolian Buddhist monarchs
People from Beijing